Antolín Monescillo y Viso (2 September 1811 – 11 August 1897) was a Spanish prelate of the Catholic Church who became a bishop in 1861 and, after transfers to positions of increasing importance, was made a cardinal in 1884 and served as Archbishop of Toledo and Primate of Spain from 1892 until his death.

Biography
Antolín Monescillo y Viso was born on 2 September 1811 in Corral de Calatrava, Ciudad Real, Spain. His family were farmers; his given name  is the Basque form of Anthony. He studied at the Seminary of Toledo,  and earned a doctorate in theology.

He was ordained a priest and worked as a journalist, contributing to El Católico and El Pensamiento Español. In 1842 he founded the daily La Cruz. 

Pope Pius IX named him bishop of Calahorra y La Calzada on 22 July 1861. He received his episcopal consecration on 6 October 1861 from Cardinal Cirilo de Alameda y Brea, archbishop of Toledo. He was transferred to see of Jaén on 27 March 1865. He attended the First Vatican Council in 1869-1870. 

Promoted to the see of Valencia on 22 June 1877.

Pope Leo XIII made him a cardinal priest on 10 November 1884; he received his red biretta and the title of Sant'Agostino on 10 June 1886.

He was transferred to the see of Toledo and given the title Patriarch of the West Indies on 11 July 1892, the archbishopric that carries the title Primate of Spain.

He died on 11 August 1897 in Toledo.

References

External links
 

1811 births
1897 deaths
People from Ciudad Real
19th-century Roman Catholic bishops in Spain
Archbishops of Toledo
Cardinals created by Pope Leo XIII